Appalachian Football Club is a National Premier Soccer League expansion team that began play in March 2021. As a result of the Appalachian State Mountaineers men's soccer team being cut in May of 2020 due to the financial impact of the COVID-19 pandemic, head coach Jason O'Keefe and a soccer executive Michael Hitchcock joined up with a group of local business owners to create the team.
They are a member of the Southeast Conference along with Georgia Revolution FC, Georgia Storm, LSA Athletico Lanier, Metro Louisville FC, and North Alabama SC.

The team plays its home games at the ASU Soccer Stadium.

Colors and Crest 
The club colors are black and gold. The club crest was designed by award-winning designer Christopher Payne, who has developed brand identities for several football clubs in the United States and the United Kingdom including Lexington SC, Flower City Union, Monterey Bay FC, and Eastleigh Football Club. The crest draws inspiration from the cryptozoological mythology and folklore of Sasquatch sightings in North Carolina and across the Appalachian Mountains.

History
Appalachian FC joined the National Premier Soccer League (NPSL), considered the fourth tier of the American soccer pyramid and roughly equal to the USL Premier Development League (PDL). Appalachian FC played their first game on May 1, 2021, ending in a 1-1 draw with Metro Louisville FC. Appalachian FC finished the 2021 season third in their conference and advanced to the Southeast Conference playoffs. They finished the season with a 2-1 loss to Georgia Storm in the semifinals on July 14, 2021.

2021 Season- Southeast Conference

2021 Southeast Conference playoffs 

Bold = winner
* = after extra time, = penalty shootout score

References

External links
 
Appalachian FC Twitter
Appalachian FC Facebook
Appalachian FC Instagram

2021 establishments in North Carolina
Association football clubs established in 2021
Soccer clubs in North Carolina
Boone, North Carolina